K.V. Johansen (born 1968) is a Canadian fantasy, science fiction, and children's author.

Krista Victoria Johansen was born in Kingston, Ontario. She holds Master's degrees in Medieval Studies and English literature.

She lives in Sackville, New Brunswick.

Bibliography

Novels
Blackdog (Pyr, 2011)
The Leopard: Marakand Volume One (Pyr, June 2014)
The Lady: Marakand Volume Two (Pyr, December 2014)
Gods of Nabban (Pyr, September 2016)
The Last Road (Pyr, September 2019)

Warlocks of Talverdin (novels)
Nightwalker (2007)
Treason in Eswy (2008)
Warden of Greyrock (2009)
The Shadow Road (2010)

Torrie Quests (novels)
Torrie and the Dragon (1997)
Torrie and the Pirate-Queen (2005) (in Danish as Sørøverdronningen, 2005; in Macedonian as Тори и пиратската кралица)
Torrie and the Firebird (2006)
Torrie and the Snake-Prince (2007) (in Macedonian as Тори и принцот-змија)
Torrie and the Dragonslayers (2009)

Cassandra Virus (novels)
The Cassandra Virus (2006)
The Drone War (2007)
The Black Box (2011)

Pippin (picture books)
Pippin Takes a Bath (1999) (in French as Au bain, coquine!, 1999)
Pippin and the Bones (2000) (in French as Coquine et son trésor, 2000)
Pippin and Pudding (2001) (in French as Coquine et Pouding, 2001)

Collections
The Serpent Bride and Other Stories from Medieval Danish Ballads (1998)
The Storyteller and other Tales (2008)

Non-fiction
Highlights in the History of Children's Fantasy (2004)
Quests and Kingdoms: A Grown-Up's Guide to Children's Fantasy Literature (2005)
Beyond Window Dressing? Canadian Children's Fantasy at the Millennium (2007)

Awards and honours
 2000 — Early Childhood Literacy Award from the Lieutenant-Governor of New Brunswick
 2004 — Frances E. Russell Award for research in children's literature from the Canadian section of the International Board on Books for Young People.
 2006 — Lilla Stirling Award, for the novel Torrie and the Pirate-Queen, awarded by the Canadian Authors Association.
 2006 — Torrie and the Pirate-Queen was a starred selection in the Our Choice Guide to Canada's Best Children's Books from the Canadian Children's Book Centre
 2007 — Ontario Library Association Best Bets Top Ten List for 2006 for Torrie and the Firebird
 2007 — Voya's Best Science Fiction, Fantasy, & Horror 2006 List for Nightwalker
 2007 — The Cassandra Virus short-listed for the 2007 Book of the Year for Children Award by the Canadian Library Association
 2007 — Torrie and the Snake-Prince short-listed for the 2008 Silver Birch Award.
 2008 — Torrie and the Snake-Prince was on the 2007 Year's Best list from Resource Links magazine
 2008 — Ontario Library Association Best Bets Top Ten List for 2007 for Nightwalker
 2008 — Nightwalker short-listed for the 2008 Snow Willow Awards
 2008 — Torrie and the Snake-Prince selected for the 2008/2009 Hackmatack Children's Choice Book Award short-list
 2008 — Nightwalker won the 2008 Ann Connor Brimer Award
 2010 — Warden of Greyrock selected for the 2009 Ontario Library Association Best Bets Top Ten List
 2010 — Johansen receives the 2010 Anna Frank Award for Children's Literature in Macedonia.
 2011 — Torrie & the Snake-Prince was chosen by IBBY (the International Board on Books for Young People) for their 2011 selection of Outstanding Books for Young People with Disabilities
 2012 — Ontario Library Association Best Bets for 2011 honourable mention for The Black Box
 2012 — Blackdog short-listed for the 2012 Sunburst Award

External links
K.V. Johansen's web site
alternate website

1968 births
Living people
20th-century Canadian novelists
21st-century Canadian novelists
Canadian children's writers
Canadian fantasy writers
Canadian science fiction writers
People from Sackville, New Brunswick
Canadian women novelists
Writers from Kingston, Ontario
Writers from New Brunswick
Women science fiction and fantasy writers
Canadian women children's writers
20th-century Canadian women writers
21st-century Canadian women writers